In geometry, an altitude of a triangle is a line segment through a vertex and perpendicular to (i.e., forming a right angle with) a line containing the base (the side opposite the vertex). This line containing the opposite side is called the extended base of the altitude. The intersection of the extended base and the altitude is called the foot of the altitude. The length of the altitude, often simply called "the altitude", is the distance between the extended base and the vertex.  The process of drawing the altitude from the vertex to the foot is known as dropping the altitude at that vertex. It is a special case of orthogonal projection.

Altitudes can be used in the computation of the area of a triangle: one-half of the product of an altitude's length and its base's length equals the triangle's area. Thus, the longest altitude is perpendicular to the shortest side of the triangle. The altitudes are also related to the sides of the triangle through the trigonometric functions.

In an isosceles triangle (a triangle with two congruent sides), the altitude having the incongruent side as its base will have the midpoint of that side as its foot. Also the altitude having the incongruent side as its base will be the angle bisector of the vertex angle.

It is common to mark the altitude with the letter  (as in height), often subscripted with the name of the side the altitude is drawn to.

  (Geometric mean theorem)

For acute triangles, the feet of the altitudes all fall on the triangle's sides (not extended). In an obtuse triangle (one with an obtuse angle), the foot of the altitude to the obtuse-angled vertex falls in the interior of the opposite side, but the feet of the altitudes to the acute-angled vertices fall on the opposite extended side, exterior to the triangle. This is illustrated in the adjacent diagram: in this obtuse triangle, an altitude dropped perpendicularly from the top vertex, which has an acute angle, intersects the extended horizontal side outside the triangle.

Orthocenter

The orthocenter lies inside the triangle if and only if the triangle is acute. If one angle is a right angle, the orthocenter coincides with the vertex at the right angle.

The orthocenter has trilinear coordinates

and barycentric coordinates

Since barycentric coordinates are all positive for a point in a triangle's interior but at least one is negative for a point in the exterior, and two of the barycentric coordinates are zero for a vertex point, the barycentric coordinates given for the orthocenter show that the orthocenter is in an acute triangle's interior, on the right-angled vertex of a right triangle, and exterior to an obtuse triangle.

Then, the complex number

is represented by the point , namely the altitude of triangle . From this, the following characterizations of the orthocenter  by means of free vectors can be established straightforwardly:

The first of the previous vector identities is also known as the problem of Sylvester, proposed by James Joseph Sylvester.

Properties

Then:

The product of the lengths of the segments that the orthocenter divides an altitude into is the same for all three altitudes:

The circle centered at  having radius the square root of this constant is the triangle's polar circle.

The sum of the ratios on the three altitudes of the distance of the orthocenter from the base to the length of the altitude is 1: (This property and the next one are applications of a more general property of any interior point and the three cevians through it.)

The sum of the ratios on the three altitudes of the distance of the orthocenter from the vertex to the length of the altitude is 2:

The isogonal conjugate of the orthocenter is the circumcenter of the triangle.

The isotomic conjugate of the orthocenter is the symmedian point of the anticomplementary triangle.

Four points in the plane, such that one of them is the orthocenter of the triangle formed by the other three, is called an orthocentric system or orthocentric quadrangle.

Relation with circles and conics

Then

In addition, denoting  as the radius of the triangle's incircle,  as the radii of its excircles, and  again as the radius of its circumcircle, the following relations hold regarding the distances of the orthocenter from the vertices:

The directrices of all parabolas that are externally tangent to one side of a triangle and tangent to the extensions of the other sides pass through the orthocenter.

A circumconic passing through the orthocenter of a triangle is a rectangular hyperbola.

Relation to other centers, the nine-point circle

The orthocenter , the centroid , the circumcenter , and the center  of the nine-point circle all lie on a single line, known as the Euler line. The center of the nine-point circle lies at the midpoint of the Euler line, between the orthocenter and the circumcenter, and the distance between the centroid and the circumcenter is half of that between the centroid and the orthocenter:

The orthocenter is closer to the incenter  than it is to the centroid, and the orthocenter is farther than the incenter is from the centroid:

Orthic triangle

If the triangle  is oblique (does not contain a right-angle), the pedal triangle of the orthocenter of the original triangle is called the orthic triangle or altitude triangle. That is, the feet of the altitudes of an oblique triangle form the orthic triangle, . Also, the incenter (the center of the inscribed circle) of the orthic triangle  is the orthocenter of the original triangle .

Trilinear coordinates for the vertices of the orthic triangle are given by

The extended sides of the orthic triangle meet the opposite extended sides of its reference triangle at three collinear points.

In any acute triangle, the inscribed triangle with the smallest perimeter is the orthic triangle. This is the solution to Fagnano's problem, posed in 1775. The sides of the orthic triangle are parallel to the tangents to the circumcircle at the original triangle's vertices.

The orthic triangle of an acute triangle gives a triangular light route.

The orthic triangle is closely related to the tangential triangle, constructed as follows:  let  be the line tangent to the circumcircle of triangle  at vertex , and define  analogously. The circumcenter of the tangential triangle, and the center of similitude of the orthic and tangential triangles, are on the Euler line.

Trilinear coordinates for the vertices of the tangential triangle are given by

The reference triangle and its orthic triangle are orthologic triangles.

For more information on the orthic triangle, see here.

Some additional altitude theorems

Altitude in terms of the sides

For any triangle with sides  and semiperimeter  the altitude from side  is given by

Inradius theorems

Consider an arbitrary triangle with sides  and with corresponding
altitudes . The altitudes and the incircle radius  are related by

Circumradius theorem

Interior point

Area theorem

General point on an altitude

If  is any point on an altitude  of any triangle , then

Special cases

Equilateral triangle

For any point  within an equilateral triangle, the sum of the perpendiculars to the three sides is equal to the altitude of the triangle.  This is Viviani's theorem.

Right triangle

In a right triangle the three altitudes  (the first two of which equal the leg lengths  and  respectively) are related according to

This is also known as the inverse Pythagorean theorem.

History
The theorem that the three altitudes of a triangle concur (at the orthocenter) is not directly stated in surviving Greek mathematical texts, but is used in the Book of Lemmas (proposition 5), attributed to Archimedes (3rd century BC), citing the "commentary to the treatise about right-angled triangles", a work which does not survive. It was also mentioned by Pappus (Mathematical Collection, VII, 62;  340). The theorem was stated and proved explicitly by al-Nasawi in his (11th century) commentary on the Book of Lemmas, and attributed to al-Quhi.

This proof in Arabic was translated as part of the (early 17th century) Latin editions of the Book of Lemmas, but was not widely known in Europe, and the theorem was therefore proven several more times in the 17th–19th century. Samuel Marolois proved it in his Geometrie (1619), and Isaac Newton proved it in an unfinished treatise Geometry of Curved Lines  Later William Chapple proved it in 1749.

A particularly elegant proof is due to François-Joseph Servois (1804) and independently Carl Friedrich Gauss (1810): Draw a line parallel to each side of the triangle through the opposite point, and form a new triangle from the intersections of these three lines. Then the original triangle is the medial triangle of the new triangle, and the altitudes of the original triangle are the perpendicular bisectors of the new triangle, and therefore concur (at the circumcenter of the new triangle).

See also
Triangle center
Median (geometry)

Notes

References

External links
 
Orthocenter of a triangle With interactive animation
Animated demonstration of orthocenter construction Compass and straightedge.
 Fagnano's Problem by Jay Warendorff, Wolfram Demonstrations Project.

Straight lines defined for a triangle
de:Höhe (Geometrie)
he:גובה (גאומטריה)